Julie Pearl Apostol Postigo (21 May 1968 – 6 May 1985), better known by her stage name Julie Vega, was a Filipina child actress, singer and commercial model. She remains very popular in her native Philippines, years after her death at the peak of her career at age of 16. She won two FAMAS Awards for Best Child Actress during her brief showbiz career.

Early life and family
Julie Vega was born as Julie Pearl Apostol Postigo on 21 May 1968 at the UERM in Quezon City, Philippines to a practicing Roman Catholic family and was the youngest and only girl of six children of dentists Julio Postigo (1931–1991) from Zamboanga del Sur and Perla Apostol (born 1932) from Iligan City. Her family nicknamed her Darling and Tata, which was given to her by her nanny Flor Argawanon and means "youngest child" in the Visayan language.

Showbiz career
Vega was discovered by film and stage director Lamberto Avellana and actress Boots Anson-Roa in 1975 while performing at a Christmas party at the Quezon Institute where her mother then worked, thus starting her career the following year at the age of six as a commercial model in television for Purefoods and Band-Aid. She first used the screen name Darling Postigo and appeared in her first film entitled Ang Pag-ibig Ko’y Huwag Mong Sukatin (You Don't Have to Measure My Love) as the young daughter of Anson-Roa and Dante Rivero. It was not until she appeared in her first major lead and breakthrough role in the 1978 film Mga Mata ni Angelita (Angelita's Eyes) that she started using the screen name Julie Vega upon the recommendation of film producer and director Larry Santiago, who owned Larry Santiago Productions which produced the film. She had been chosen to play the title role despite placing only third among over 200 applicants for the role.

Although Vega later had to turn down the title role of Flor de Luna due to her schedule with acting and school, she would finally have her own soap opera when she was cast as the title character in GMA Network’s Anna Liza. Her portrayal of the sensitive, sad-sack and frequently oppressed title character drew the sympathy and affections of the Filipino viewing public and further solidified her star status. The success of Anna Liza made her the chief soap opera rival of Janice de Belen, a fellow child star who also enjoyed success with Flor de Luna, the title role Vega previously turned down, as the two dramas rivaled each other for the attention of the television-viewing public. Yet despite being rivals, the two were best friends in real life. De Belen once mentioned, "There could be no me if Julie accepted the role as Flor de Luna."

Aside from her work in Anna Liza, Vega also starred in several films and won two FAMAS acting awards overall. She won Best Child Actress for Mga Mata ni Angelita and Durugin si Totoy Bato and was nominated for Best Child Actress for Mga Basang Sisiw and Best Supporting Actress for Isang Bala Ka Lang!.

When Vega became a teenager, she was signed to Regal Films by producer Lily Monteverde, who also owned the film company since its inception in 1962. She was then included among the so-called Regal "Cry Babies" along with then fellow teenaged actresses De Belen, Maricel Soriano, and Snooky Serna. She did a total of six films for Regal, including Where Love Has Gone, Mother Dear, To Mama with Love, and Daddy's Little Darlings, all of which became certified box office hits.

Singing career
Aside from acting, Vega also became a successful singer in her own right. She initially refused to pursue a singing career of her own, but after repeated prodding from her older brother Joey, who noticed her beautiful singing voice, she finally consented to doing so. She took formal voice lessons under renowned songwriter Cecille Azarcon to further hone her singing voice. With the training she received, she was able to sing many of the theme songs of the movies she appeared in like Dear Mama, Where Love Has Gone, Don't Cry for Me Papa and Iiyak Ka Rin.

It was during one of her singing promotions for Where Love Has Gone that Vega was discovered by Bong Carrion, who then offered her to be a recording artist for the then newly formed Emerald Recording Company owned by Carreon and his then wife, the famous Filipina singer Imelda Papin. Her debut single Somewhere in My Past, composed by Mon Del Rosario, was a major hit which became a certified gold record in only its first few weeks of release and would prove to be her most enduring hit and the one song she would be most identified with. The single's success prompted Bong Carreon and Imelda Papin to launch Vega as a full-time solo artist by coming up with the latter's 1985 debut album First Love, which included Somewhere in My Past and produced her further hit songs like Someone Special, The Memory Will Remain, and the eponymous title track itself.

According to Vega, she particularly liked singing because it is through this medium that she is able to best express her inner thoughts and feelings. This became especially true after the loss of her brother Joey, to whom she was particularly very close. Joey was stabbed to death in a car by hired killers, who mistook him for another person they were hired to look for and then kill, while hanging out with his friends in 1983. His untimely death at the age of 22 proved to be devastating for the young Julie, who then repeatedly wished to join him in death.

Education
In spite of her hectic showbiz schedule, Vega was still able to attend to her studies in school. She studied at the Our Lady of Sacred Heart School from grade school until first year high school before transferring to St. Joseph's College where she finished her high school education. The schools proved to be accessible to her since both are located not far from where her family used to live at 11th Avenue, Murphy, Cubao, Quezon City.

Illness and early death

Not long after her high school graduation in 1985, Vega began complaining of extreme weakness and lack of sensation, particularly on her lower body. This prompted her parents to bring her to a private hospital. She was later diagnosed with a form of demyelinating disease, which was highly suspected to be either Guillain–Barré syndrome or multiple sclerosis. As Vega's condition became worse, her parents were forced to have her confined to the Quezon Institute as they could no longer afford the increasing amount of her hospital bills. Sometime after her confinement there, she contracted bronchopneumonia, making her condition even worse than before.

Vega was transferred to the Lung Center of the Philippines in Quezon City at about 5:00 p.m on Monday, May 6, 1985 where she died suddenly around 1½ hours later at the hospital's intensive care unit, just fifteen days shy of her seventeenth birthday. Her cause of death was officially listed as cardiac arrest secondary to bronchopneumonia. Vega's father Julio would himself die of lung cancer exactly six years later in the same hospital. Her untimely death left Anna Liza with an incomplete storyline and the Filipino people in total shock. After lying in state at Mount Carmel Church in Quezon City, her body was laid to rest right next to those of her father, brother and paternal grandmother at the Loyola Memorial Park in Marikina in a funeral attended by millions of grieving fans and colleagues from Philippine showbiz.

At the time of her death, Vega left behind a large body of unfinished work aside from Anna Liza. She was supposed to promote her debut album First Love, do a second album for Emerald containing all Filipino language songs, perform with Imelda Papin in singing engagements both in the Philippines and abroad, start hosting two television shows (her own, Julie and Friends on Maharlika Broadcasting System, and as alternate host of Student Canteen on GMA), and star as one of the mainstays of the then upcoming teen-oriented talent show That's Entertainment on GMA. She was also supposed to attend the University of the Philippines for her college education.

Life story
Vega's life story was most notably shown on film through The Life Story of Julie Vega, which was shown shortly after her death. Nadia Montenegro portrayed the ill-fated movie and soap opera actress and singer, Jimmy Morato and Alicia Alonzo portrayed her parents, while her brother Steve and nanny Flor appeared as themselves. That's Entertainment mainstays Jestoni Alarcon, John Regala and Hero Bautista also portrayed her brothers in the film. On television, through the October 2, 2003 episode of Maalaala Mo Kaya entitled Unan (Tagalog for Pillow) played by Angelica Panganiban and Jane Oineza as Young Julie Vega. Vega's parents were portrayed by Michael de Mesa and Rio Locsin. The said episode was well received by both critics and Julie Vega fans alike and is noted not only for Panganiban's resemblance to the real Julie Vega, but also for its use of actual footage of Vega's burial which featured not only fans but also celebrities like Fernando Poe, Jr., Chiquito, Nida Blanca, Herbert Bautista and best friend Janice De Belen in mourning her death. The video footage was lent to the Maalaala Mo Kaya producers for the episode by the Postigos themselves.

Legacy and tributes

Due to Anna Liza'''s success, Vega was dubbed the "Original Soap Opera Princess". Director Ruel Bayani, the producer of ABS-CBN's remake of Anna Liza, commended Vega, calling her portrayal of the role "iconic" and that she set a high standard on being a "child star". Judy Ann Santos once stated on StarStudio's special issue that she is a fan of Vega, and when she learned about the latter's death, she first disappeared into her room and then into the bathroom. She turned the bathroom's doorknob quietly, pushed the door shut then stood in front of the sink. She then looked at herself in the mirror and cried.

Her rivalry with Janice De Belen ranks among the more famous female rivalries in Philippines' entertainment industry alongside that of Vilma Santos vs. Nora Aunor.

In December 2010, Vega was posthumously awarded her own star on the Eastwood City Walk of Fame as well as another on GMA Network's "Kapuso Walk of Fame".

Filmography

Movies

Television

Discography
Album
 First Love'' – 1985, Emerald Recording Company

All songs were written by Mon Del Rosario except for "First Love", which was written by Alex Catedrilla.
 "Someone Special"
 "First Love"
 "Somewhere in My Past"
 "Only a Dream"
 "So Impatient"
 "The Memory Will Remain"

Awards/recognitions and nominations

References

External links

Video 48: JULIE VEGA

1968 births
1985 deaths
Burials at the Loyola Memorial Park
Deaths from pneumonia in the Philippines
Deaths from bronchopneumonia
Filipino child actresses
Filipino child singers
Filipino female models
Filipino film actresses
Filipino Roman Catholics
Filipino television actresses
People from Quezon City
Tagalog people
20th-century Filipino actresses
20th-century Filipino women singers
GMA Network personalities